Pity (c. 1795) is a colour print on paper, finished in ink and watercolour, by the English artist and poet William Blake, one of the group known as the "Large Colour Prints". Along with his other works of this period, it was influenced by the Bible, Milton, and Shakespeare. The work is unusual, as it is a literal illustration of a double simile from Macbeth, found in the lines:
And pity, like a naked new-born babe,
Striding the blast, or heaven's cherubim, hors'd
Upon the sightless couriers of the air. 
- Macbeth (1.7.21–23)
 	
Like other members of the group it is a monotype produced by printing from a matrix consisting of paint on gessoed millboard, with each impression then finished by hand. By this unusual means Blake could obtain up to three impressions from a single painting. Three such impressions survive of Pity. A fourth, in the British Museum, was an early trial of the design from a different matrix, as it is smaller than the others.

Interpretations
Martin Butlin wrote that this colour print is one of the most inspired of all 'literal' illustrations of a text in the history of art. In fact, "pity and air", two words of the Shakespeare's verses, are also two motifs used by Blake in this picture: a female cherub leans down to snatch the baby from its mother. According to Blake biographer Alexander Gilchrist, the print "is on a tolerably large scale, a woman bending down to succour a man stretched out at length, as if given over to death."

Pity is seen as in opposition to Blake's print The Night of Enitharmon's Joy (c. 1795) — which shows a Hecate surrounded by  fantastic creatures and macabre elements of a nightmare — because it provides a "possibility of salvation" in the fallen world through pity. Both prints refer to Macbeth. As Nicholas Rawlinson has noted, the play was undergoing a major revival in popularity at the time, being performed nine times in 1795.

It is a personification of a Christian element that some critics argue was a negative virtue for Blake, since pity is associated with "the failure of inspiration and a further dividing" and also "linked by alliteration and capitalization". It is also a part of Blake's mythology, in which a sexually frustrated Tharmas becomes "a terror to all living things", although the emotion inherent in him is pity. Other Blake characters have this feeling, and his mythology is developed between the confrontation of a feminine "Pity" and a masculine fiery, as happens in the brutal suppression of desire in Urizen.

Some critics see a connection between Pity and the "hypnotic and helpless state" of William Butler Yeats' The Wind Among the Reeds (1899).

Versions

The print exists in four versions from two different matrices. The most elaborate and best-known version of the print is in the Tate Gallery, London, sometimes described as the only finished one. It was presented by W. Graham Robertson to the gallery in 1939, and is catalogued as "Butlin 310".

A unique "proof print" is in the British Museum (Butlin 313). It is "significantly smaller than the final version of the design" and depicts the supine figure "partially covered in vegetation" in the form of sweeping fronds of long grass.

Another version of the image is in the collection of the Metropolitan Museum of Art. This is not as elaborately worked as the Tate print. It was donated by Mrs. Robert W. Goelet in 1958.

A lightly retouched version at the Yale Center for British Art also exists, somewhat yellowed by varnish. According to The William Blake Archive, "The characteristics of the color printing indicate that this impression is the first one printed from the larger matrix in 1795. The second impression in this printing is Pity in the Tate Collection (Butlin 310); the third impression is in the Metropolitan Museum of Art, New York (Butlin 311)."

References

External links
 Pity by William Blake. Page on Tate Gallery official website.
 Tate Learning. Artists in Focus: William Blake in Tate official website.

Art by William Blake
William Blake's mythology
Romantic paintings
1795 prints
Collection of the Tate galleries
Prints and drawings in the British Museum
Paintings in the collection of the Metropolitan Museum of Art
Watercolor paintings
Paintings based on works by William Shakespeare
Works based on Macbeth